Salomé Kora (born 8 June 1994) is a Swiss sprinter. She competed in the women's 4 × 100 metres relay event at the 2016 Summer Olympics and at the 2017 World Championships in London.

References

External links
 

1994 births
Living people
Swiss female sprinters
Place of birth missing (living people)
Athletes (track and field) at the 2016 Summer Olympics
Olympic athletes of Switzerland
Universiade medalists in athletics (track and field)
Universiade gold medalists for Switzerland
Universiade bronze medalists for Switzerland
Medalists at the 2019 Summer Universiade
Medalists at the 2017 Summer Universiade
Athletes (track and field) at the 2020 Summer Olympics
Olympic female sprinters
Sportspeople from St. Gallen (city)
Swiss people of Beninese descent
Swiss sportspeople of African descent